The Old Course Hotel, or its full name, the Old Course Hotel, Golf Resort & Spa, is a five-star hotel in St Andrews, Fife, Scotland.

The hotel borders the Road Hole of the Old Course, and has 175 rooms, including 35 suites.

It was built in 1968, on the site of the old railway station, by British Transport Hotels Ltd (which was a subsidiary of British Railways). In 2004, Herb Kohler bought the hotel and now it is operated by Destination Kohler, a subsidiary of the American Kohler Company. The former stationmaster's house still stands and is called the Jigger Inn, which forms part of the hotel complex. In 2020, the hotel completed an expansion, which included 31 additional rooms and the Swilcan Loft restaurant.

References

External links
 
 

Hotels in Fife
Kohler Company
St Andrews
Hotel buildings completed in 1968
1968 establishments in Scotland